BeOS R5 is the final version of BeOS from Be Inc. It was released in March 2000,  and came in two varieties: Professional and Personal.

R5 was the 4th major release of BeOS for a public audience, and the 6th since it left developer-only stages. It changed only slightly from the previous release, BeOS R4.5, and was even seeded to developers as "R4.6". Improved POSIX compliance, particularly in the area of networking, was provided.  The OS in general was moved towards the new modular media kit over the former audio-only sound subsystem. For end-users, new logos and some new icons were the only major differences.

R5 was the first release of BeOS for x86 to have a freely downloadable version which could be fully installed on a user's hard drive; previous versions had a free Live CD download, which could not be installed. R5 was also to be the last version to support the PowerPC architecture which BeOS had originated on, including the company's own BeBox hardware. According to Be's marketing, it was the first OS to ship with legal MP3 encoding and decoding support.

Versions

Personal Edition
Personal Edition, a 48MB download, was the most commonly used version of R5. Stripped of developer tools (though these were later made available as a separate download), mp3 and Indeo encoders, and RealPlayer, it was installed into a 500MB "hardfile" through Windows or Linux, and could be booted either directly from Windows 9x or DOS, or using a boot floppy. Once booted, it could be installed to a real hard drive or partition, and the Be Bootloader could be installed to allow dual-booting. This bootloader uses only the MBR of the hard disk, and will continue to function even if the BeOS is uninstalled.

Professional Edition
Professional Edition was only available commercially, and for the first time in BeOS's history, could not be purchased from the company unless you were a developer. Instead, a number of regional resellers sold it - Gobe Software in the United States, Apacabar and Koch Media in Europe, and Hitachi in Asia. These resellers were responsible for all packaging of the OS, from localisation to CD labelling and packaging. As a result, some variations exist between packaged R5 Professional discs, with some being slipstream updated to the newest patches, and most notably, the inclusion of commercial printer drivers with Gobe releases, and French translations of the user documentation on Apacabar.

The CD shipped with an ISO9660/HFS hybrid partition, containing documentation, GPL licensed source code, the Personal Edition installer (with the aim of you circulating the installer to friends), a copy of Partition Magic for Windows, and the Mac OS boot-loading code for the PowerPC version. Two separate BFS partitions existed, one for x86, one for PowerPC, and the x86 one is directly bootable from CD.

In addition to all the features of Personal Edition, Professional Edition includes the full developers tools, including a rebranded CodeWarrior, RealPlayer G2, Fraunhofer MP3 encoders, and support for both encoding Indeo video, and playback/encoding of Indeo Real Time. Additional media on the CD varied by supplier, but always included some sample multimedia files, including two songs composed by Be staff ("5038" and "virtual (void)") as well as a video of Be staff pushing computer monitors off the roof of their building in Menlo Park.

Updates
Three updates for R5 were released during 2000.

R5.01
R5.01 was mainly a stability fix for R5 Professional, fixing some deadlocks in drivers and critical servers. However, additional POSIX support was again added for networking, although the update neglected to include the newer headers to use some of these functions - they were only available in an updated Developer Tools for Personal Edition download.

R5.02
R5.02 (marked as R5.01 on personal) contained all of R5.01's updates, as well as some enhanced drivers, and more stability fixes.

R5.03
R5.03 was solely a security fix, and fixed a remote-access bug in the system's ftpd. The update, however, made a change to the core C library to do this, and in doing so, updated the version of glibc it was based on, again providing slightly more POSIX compatibility.

Succession
Following the failure of BeIA, Be's Internet Appliance venture, the company ceased operations, and R5 was the last official release. A widely leaked version of BeOS that had been seeded to developers, codenamed Dano, carried many new features, and a build ID indicating it was BeOS R5.1.0.

Another extremely widely leaked update is a new, fully POSIX compliant, kernel-land networking stack, known internally in Be as BONE. While officially alpha, this brings higher stability to R5, as well as opening up the application base available. The updater for BONE Alpha 7 increases the system version number to R5.04.

ZETA was accepted by some BeOS users as a successor to R5; however, legal issues surrounding how Magnussoft obtained Be Inc's source code later led to the discontinuation of the product.   However, at least during its protracted release candidate stage, it was dogged with problems that left some people using R5, and in some cases, looking to Haiku for the future of their OS.

Haiku, now on its beta release, is now the last surviving successor to BeOS. Although deemed by the developers as beta software, the stability, compatibility with BeOS binaries and feature-completeness make Haiku a viable option today. Haiku has even improved on BeOS, and includes features never implemented into BeOS, including: wifi support; the layout kit; a unique package manager; and support for x64 processors and modern hardware.

External links 
 BeOS 5 Personal Edition

BeOS